Cults is a small parish and hamlet close to the centre of the Kingdom of Fife, Scotland.

The parish contains various villages, farms and hamlets including Cults, Pitlessie, Crossgates and Walton.  The only archaeological site of any importance seems to be a fort on the western slope of Walton Hill.

Its name is derived from the Scottish Gaelic cùilt meaning a corner or recess.

Notable residents 
Cults' most well-known resident was Sir David Wilkie (1785–1841) born in Cults Church manse. His father was parish minister and while Wilkie lived in Cults, characters in the parish served as models for his paintings Pitlessie Fair (1804) and the Village Politicians (1806). Cults Kirk contains a handsome monument in marble, by Chantrey, erected by Wilkie in memory of his parents and another to his memory, erected by his sister in 1844.

Notable landmarks

Houses 

The parish contains the shell and estate of Crawford Priory, originally the seat of the Earl of Glasgow, and latterly Lord Cochrane of Cults. 

The now-demolished Priestfield House, once the seat of the Martin Smith family, was nearby at Pitlessie.

Cults Kirk 
Cults Kirk has lain in the centre of the parish at the Kirkton of Cults for at least 800 years and may predate Christianity. The current building was constructed in 1793 under the oversight of Sir David Wilkie's father, Rev. David Wilkie, and then extended in 1835. It consists of a rectangular sandstone structure with a narrow bell tower to the western side surrounded by a graveyard predating the church building. The session house lies directly to the west of the kirk and predates the current building. The manse, to the southwest, is now a private residence.

The kirk became part of a congregation along with Kettle church in 1963, before this combined with the churches of Ladybank and Collessie to form the Howe of Fife Parish Church congregation in 1983.

Gallery

References

External links 
 'Vision of Britain' website for a map of the Cults area. Retrieved 2012-02-27.

Parishes in Fife
Villages in Fife